Safety behaviour is behaviour associated with safety.  It may refer to:

 Behavior-based safety, improving safety by monitoring and changing the behaviour of the people involved
 Safety behaviors (anxiety), stress-relieving activity performed by anxious people
 Safety culture, general attitudes to safety at workplaces and dangerous activities
 Risk compensation, adjusting behavior depending on perceived level of safety (or risk)

Safety